David Ogilvy may refer to:

David Ogilvy (businessman) (1911–1999), British advertising executive
David Ogilvy (cricketer) (1859–1917), Australian cricketer
David Ogilvy, 9th Earl of Airlie (1785–1849), Scottish representative peer, Lord Lieutenant of Angus 1826–1849
David Ogilvy, 10th Earl of Airlie (1826–1881), his son, Scottish representative peer 
David Ogilvy, 11th Earl of Airlie (1856–1900), his son, Scottish soldier and representative peer
David Ogilvy, 12th Earl of Airlie (1893–1968), his son, Scottish Lord Chamberlain 1937–1965, 1936–1967
David Ogilvy, 13th Earl of Airlie (born 1926), his son, Scottish Lord Chamberlain from 1984, Lord Lieutenant of Angus from 1989
David Ogilvy (1804–1871), first president of the Law Institute of Victoria

See also 
David Ogilvie (disambiguation)
 Ogilvy (name)